Pancreatic elastase II (pancreatic elastase 2) is an enzyme. This enzyme catalyses the following chemical reaction

 Preferential cleavage: Leu-, Met- and Phe-. Hydrolyses elastin

This peptidase from trypsin family is formed by activation of proelastase II from mammalian pancreas by trypsin.

References

External links 
 

EC 3.4.21